Python is a Cobra replica automobile company based in Melbourne, Australia. Founded in 1981, this company has no relation to the more widely known Python automobile created in the 1980s by Kelly Motors at Riverside, California and later at Fort Collins, Colorado.

See also

 List of automobile manufacturers
 List of car brands

References

Car manufacturers of Australia